Bontoc, officially the Municipality of Bontoc, is a 4th class municipality in the province of Southern Leyte, Philippines. According to the 2020 census, it has a population of 29,799 people.

The town is home to the Bontoc Campus of the Southern Leyte State University, which offers agricultural and industrial courses.

The town celebrates their fiesta in honor of the Holy Child Jesus. The Ulang Festival, held annually on January 15, is celebrated by colorful participants dancing in honor of the icon of the Señor Santo Niño (Holy Child Jesus). Some devotees to the Señor Santo Niño said that it can performed miracles that can heal sickness of those who touches the said icon.

Etymology
The name “Bontoc” is derived from an old creek called Bontoc creek near the present Roman Catholic Cemetery where old “pueblo” called Daan Lungsod existed during the early Spanish regime.

History
Before the coming of the Spaniards, Bontoc was a wilderness where few natives lived and wild animals roamed. When the Spaniards came, they found scattered warring tribes of primitive Malays who settled in prosperous villages near the mouth and along the fertile plains of the historic Salog river basin. They then successfully subjugated these warring tribes and immigrants and founded a cluster of villages which later on formed the nucleus of the Barrio of Bontoc.

As far as history could recall the most popular among the ancient warring chiefs, was Mariano Barcelon who was nicknamed as “Tahug”. He was acclaimed to be the bravest of the braves. His name was a terror to the Moro pirates that swarmed Philippine waters during the 16th century.

During the Spanish time up to the early part of the American regime, Bontoc was ruled by a succession of native “Cabezas de barangay”, a unit government organization during that time. Bontoc was at that time a tributary “pueblo” belonging to the old town of Libagon which governed the people for many years both in civil and religious matter by a line of “capitanes or gobernadocillos.

The cabezas de barangay who governed this little pueblo also earned for themselves the honor of being called “capitan” by their own people. The church wielded tremendous power at that time in the affairs of the government. Any person who offends the clergy or disobeys religious order is severely punished.

Among the well-known capitanes who controlled the reins of the local administration of this barrio were: Hilario Barcelon, Manuel Leyes, Romualdo Tubia, Florentino Flores, Felipe Aguilar and the last well-known cabeza or capitan was Gerardo Faelnar popularly known among the people as Capitan Dadoy whose administration lasted up to the early days of American occupation.

Shortly after the coming of the Americans, Bontoc became a unit barrio of Sogod.

During the Japanese occupation, the town served as the seat of resistance movement against the Japanese with its general headquarters in sitio Mamingaw, Barangay Banahaw and under the command of Colonel Ruperto K. Kangleon. In one notable raid, an entire truckload of Japanese soldiers on patrol was completely annihilated at Sitio Trece, Barangay Santo Niño. A small monument stands in front of Bontoc motor pool at Sitio Trece commemorates this event.

On June 15, 1950, it became a regular municipality by the operative provisions of Republic Act No. 522.

Geography
The town is situated on a long stretch of rich alluvial plain, which considered as the greatest farming region in the entire Sogod Bay District, and is drained by the Salog and Divisoria Rivers. Because of its rich soil, there is much rice farming. The town is also the producer of abaca, copra and tobacco in the Bay District.

Barangays
Bontoc is politically subdivided into 40 barangays.

Climate

Demographics

Economy

References

External links

Official Website of Bontoc, Southern Leyte
 [ Philippine Standard Geographic Code]
Philippine Census Information
Local Governance Performance Management System

Municipalities of Southern Leyte